The 2018 Hong Kong Open was the fourth event of the 2018 ITTF World Tour. It was the first staging of the event, and took place from 24–27 May at the Queen Elizabeth Stadium in Hong Kong.

Men's singles

Seeds

Draw

Top half

Bottom half

Finals

Women's singles

Seeds

Draw

Top half

Bottom half

Finals

Men's doubles

Seeds

Draw

Women's doubles

Seeds

Draw

References

External links

Tournament page on ITTF website

Hong Kong Open
Hong Kong Open
Table tennis competitions in Hong Kong
International sports competitions hosted by Hong Kong
Hong Kong Open